Mikhail Kountras (born 31 January 1952) is a Greek former cyclist. He competed in three events at the 1976 Summer Olympics.

References

External links
 

1952 births
Living people
Greek male cyclists
Olympic cyclists of Greece
Cyclists at the 1976 Summer Olympics
People from Rhodes
Sportspeople from the South Aegean
20th-century Greek people